Quentin Dick Kedzlie (22 March 1861 – 3 May 1920) was a Scottish-born international rugby union forward who played club rugby for Cardiff and international rugby for Wales. In his later life he became the chairman of the South Wales Baseball Association.

Rugby career
Kedzlie played for Canton RFC and Roath Windsor (Cardiff) before joining Cardiff. He represented Cardiff for seven seasons during 1881 to 1892. He played in three notable games during his career with Cardiff, two at international level and one for his club.

On 4 February 1888, Kedzlie was selected to represent Wales in the opening game of the Home Nations Championship, played at Rodney Parade against Scotland. Kedzlie was one of five new caps brought into the Welsh pack for the game, which was captained by Newport's Tom Clapp. Wales won the game through a single try, from London Welsh back Tom Pryce-Jenkins. Kedzlie was reselected for the second and last game of the 1888 Championship, travelling to Lansdowne Road, Dublin to face Ireland. The selectors kept faith in the forwards, fielding an unchanged pack for the first time in Welsh rugby history. Wales lost the game and Kedzlie did not represent the country again.

Although his international career was now over, Kedzlie played his part in another landmark game, when he was chosen to play for Cardiff against the touring New Zealand Natives. Although having lost to Llanelli and Wales, the Māori team had been able to defeat both Swansea and Newport over the past five days. After an early try from Norman Biggs, Cardiff won the forward battle on a slow and wet pitch, winning the game by a goal.

Kedzlie's brothers Alexander and James also played for Canton RFC.
His great nephew Bill Kedzlie kept up the family tradition by playing rugby for the RAF.

International matches played
Wales
  1888
  1888

References

Sources
 
 
 
 
 

1861 births
1920 deaths
Wales international rugby union players
Scottish rugby union players
Rugby union forwards
Rugby union players from Glasgow
Cardiff RFC players
Canton RFC players